Bezruč is a Czech-language surname. Notable people with the surname include:
 Petr Bezruč, the pseudonym of Vladimír Vašek (1867 - 1958)

See also 
 Bezrukov
 Bezdružice

Czech-language surnames